Yunnan sudden death syndrome is a label used to define unexplained cases of cardiac arrest, which afflicted significant numbers of rural villagers in Yunnan province, in southwest China. The cause turned out to be a mushroom now blamed for an estimated 400 deaths in the past three decades.

The mysterious fatalities were recorded for decades before researchers from the Chinese Center for Disease Control and Prevention isolated a significant factor common in every case: a tiny unknown mushroom which was unintentionally gathered and consumed during wild mushroom harvests in the region. Previously the syndrome was thought to be caused by Keshan disease, which is caused by the Coxsackie virus.

The mushroom, Trogia venenata, is also known as 'Little White'.  It has been determined that families collecting fungi to sell have been eating these Little White mushrooms as they have no commercial value.  Three amino acids present in the mushrooms have been shown to be toxic.  The mushrooms have also been shown to contain very high quantities of barium, and it may be that some of the deaths are simply from barium poisoning.

In the hours before death, about two-thirds of the victims had such symptoms as nausea, dizziness, heart palpitations, seizures and fatigue.

However, in December 2012 it was announced that Dr Xu Jianping (徐建平) has been collecting samples of Trogia venenata in Yunnan for the past three years, and his research now shows that barium levels in the wild mushroom are no higher than those of common foods such as poultry and fish.  Nonetheless, it appears the mushroom will still likely play a role. Since publication of the widely circulated 2010 Science article, no instances of Yunnan sudden death syndrome have been reported.

See also
List of deadly fungi
Mushroom poisoning

References

External links
Images of the mushroom

 
Poisoning by drugs, medicaments and biological substances

Health in Yunnan
Syndromes